Ceredigion Archives  is a regional archive service and the county record office for Ceredigion County Council. Located since 2012 in Aberystwyth Town Hall, the archive collects, curates, preserves and gives access to records relating to the county and its administration.  

The archives is open to members of the public for research, family history, local history, university degree work, academic research, and research for business purposes.

History 
The Ceredigion County Archives was established in 1974 as the third record office for Dyfed and was originally known as Cardiganshire Area Record Office. It was renamed and re-launched as Ceredigion Archives in 1996. Until 2012 the Archive was located in the Grade II listed Queen's Hotel building on Aberystwyth Promanade but when the council sold that building, a new purpose built archive complex was built at the Old Town Hall, which also houses the town Library. In 2019 the Archives secured funding from the Welsh Government to purchase the nearby old lifeboat station and convert it into an archival storage facility.

Collections  

The archives holds a number of important historical collections relating to the history of Ceredigion. These include court records, estate records and parish registers, making the archives a popular destination for family history researchers. The archive also includes a collection of 19th century shipping records and a comprehensive collection of car registration records, charting the history of motoring in the county.

In 2015 the archives received a grant from the National Manuscripts Conservation Trust to preserve an important letter from a local soldier who fought at the Battle of Waterloo.

The archives also holds the public archives of Ceredigion County Council including electoral rolls, school records and local council records.

References

External links 
 Ceredigion Archives Website

Archives in Wales
Buildings and structures in Aberystwyth